W-26 was a W-19-class minesweeper operated by the Imperial Japanese Navy during World War II.

Design
The ship was ordered in August 1941 under the Rapid Naval Armaments Supplement Programme. Built by Mitsubishi Yards in Yokohama, the ship was laid down in 1942, launched in late 1942, and completed on 31 March 1943.

Operational career
On 2 November, W-26 was damaged by bombs, while at Rabaul, New Britain, and beached to prevent her loss. She was repaired and refloated and departed Rabaul for Truk on 23 November. W-26 underwent further repairs in December at Rabaul, tied up alongside Hakkai Maru. While anchored in Karavia Bay, near Rabaul on 17 February 1944, she was attacked by SBD dive-bombers and TBF torpedo-bombers of the United States Navy. Sunk in the attack were W-26, Iwate Maru, and guardboat Funku Maru No. 2. She was removed from the Navy List on 30 April 1944.

Her wreck was partially salvaged by Nanyo Boeki Kaisha in 1958.

References

1942 ships
Ships built by Mitsubishi Heavy Industries
World War II mine warfare vessels of Japan
Mine warfare vessels of the Imperial Japanese Navy
Maritime incidents in November 1943
Maritime incidents in February 1944
Ships sunk by US aircraft
Minesweepers sunk by aircraft
Shipwrecks of Papua New Guinea